This list of state and other conventions associated with the Southern Baptist Convention contains those geographically based conventions and associations that associate with the Southern Baptist Convention.

State conventions
State conventions associated with the SBC include:

 Alabama Baptist Convention
 Alaska Baptist Convention
 Arizona Southern Baptist Convention
 Arkansas Baptist State Convention
 California Southern Baptist Convention
 Colorado Baptist General Convention
 Dakota Baptist Convention
 Florida Baptist Convention
 Georgia Baptist Convention
 Hawaii Pacific Baptist Convention
 Illinois Baptist State Association
 State Convention of Baptists in Indiana
 Baptist Convention of Iowa
 Kansas-Nebraska Convention of Southern Baptists
 Kentucky Baptist Convention
 Louisiana Baptist Convention
 Baptist Convention of Maryland/Delaware
 Baptist State Convention of Michigan
 Minnesota-Wisconsin Baptist Convention
 Mississippi Baptist Convention Board
 Missouri Baptist Convention
 Montana Southern Baptist Convention
 Nevada Baptist Convention
 Baptist Convention of New England
 Baptist Convention of New Mexico
 Baptist Convention of New York
 Baptist State Convention of North Carolina
 Northwest Baptist Convention
 State Convention of Baptists in Ohio
 Baptist General Convention of Oklahoma
 Baptist Convention of Pennsylvania/South Jersey
 South Carolina Baptist Convention
 Tennessee Baptist Convention
 Baptist General Convention of Texas 
 Southern Baptists of Texas Convention (SBTC) 
 Utah-Idaho Southern Baptist Convention
 Baptist General Association of Virginia 
 Southern Baptist Conservatives of Virginia 
 West Virginia Convention of Southern Baptists
 Wyoming Southern Baptist Convention

Additional supported and affiliated conventions
 Convention of Southern Baptist Churches in Puerto Rico

See also
List of Southern Baptist Convention affiliated people

References

Further reading

External links

Southern Baptist Convention